The Blaine Hill "S" Bridge is located over Wheeling Creek at the western boundaries of Blaine in Belmont County, Ohio, United States. The bridge was designated the Ohio Bicentennial Bridge in 2003, and was placed on the National Register of Historic Places on March 17, 2010.

Built in 1826, the Blaine Hill Bridge is the oldest standing bridge in Ohio.

References

Further reading
Blaine Hill "S" Bridge at Bridges & Tunnels
Blaine Hill "S" Bridge at HistoricBridges.org

National Register of Historic Places in Belmont County, Ohio
Bridges completed in 1828
Bridges in Belmont County, Ohio
Road bridges on the National Register of Historic Places in Ohio
Stone arch bridges in the United States